Calandria may refer to:

 Calandria (nuclear reactor),  the CANDU reactor
 La Calandria (play), a comedy of the Italian Renaissance
 Heating equipment used during brewing
 Plural form for the calandra lark, a bird species 
 A thermosyphon reboiler
 A shell and tube heat exchanger

See also
 Calandra (disambiguation)
 Calandrinia